In mathematical finite group theory, the Puig subgroup, introduced by , is a characteristic subgroup of a p-group analogous to the Thompson subgroup.

Definition

If H is a subgroup of a group G, then LG(H) is the subgroup of G generated by the abelian subgroups normalized by H. 

The subgroups Ln of G are defined recursively by
L0 is the trivial subgroup
Ln+1 = LG(Ln)
They have the property that
L0 ⊆ L2 ⊆ L4... ⊆ ...L5 ⊆ L3 ⊆ L1

The Puig subgroup L(G) is the intersection of the subgroups Ln for n odd, and the subgroup L*(G) is the union of the subgroups Ln for n even.

Properties

Puig proved that if G is a (solvable) group of odd order, p is a prime, and S is a Sylow p-subgroup of G, and the p′-core of G is trivial, then the center Z(L(S)) of the Puig subgroup of S is a normal subgroup of G.

References

Finite groups